In geography and geology, a cliff is an area of rock which has a general angle defined by the vertical, or nearly vertical. Cliffs are formed by the processes of weathering and erosion, with the effect of gravity. Cliffs are common on coasts, in mountainous areas, escarpments and along rivers. Cliffs are usually composed of rock that is resistant to weathering and erosion. The sedimentary rocks that are most likely to form cliffs include sandstone, limestone, chalk, and dolomite. Igneous rocks such as granite and basalt also often form cliffs.

An escarpment (or scarp) is a type of cliff formed by the movement of a geologic fault, a landslide, or sometimes by rock slides or falling rocks which change the differential erosion of the rock layers.

Most cliffs have some form of scree slope at their base. In arid areas or under high cliffs, they are generally exposed jumbles of fallen rock. In areas of higher moisture, a soil slope may obscure the talus. Many cliffs also feature tributary waterfalls or rock shelters. Sometimes a cliff peters out at the end of a ridge, with mushroom rocks or other types of rock columns remaining. Coastal erosion may lead to the formation of sea cliffs along a receding coastline.

The Ordnance Survey distinguishes between around most cliffs (continuous line along the topper edge with projections down the face) and outcrops (continuous lines along lower edge).

Etymology 
Cliff comes from the Old English word clif of essentially the same meaning, cognate with Dutch, Low German, and Old Norse klif 'cliff'. These may in turn all be from a Romance loanword into Primitive Germanic that has its origins in the Latin forms  ("slope" or "hillside").

Large and famous cliffs

Given that a cliff does not need to be exactly vertical, there can be ambiguity about whether a given slope is a cliff or not and also about how much of a certain slope to count as a cliff. For example, given a truly vertical rock wall above a very steep slope, one could count just the rock wall or the combination. Listings of cliffs are thus inherently uncertain.

Some of the largest cliffs on Earth are found underwater. For example, an 8,000 m drop over a 4,250 m span can be found at a ridge sitting inside the Kermadec Trench.

According to some sources, the highest cliff in the world, about 1,340 m high, is the east face of Great Trango in the Karakoram mountains of northern Pakistan. This uses a fairly stringent notion of cliff, as the 1,340 m figure refers to a nearly vertical headwall of two stacked pillars; adding in a very steep approach brings the total drop from the East Face precipice to the nearby Dunge Glacier to nearly 2,000 m.

The location of the world's highest sea cliffs depends also on the definition of 'cliff' that is used. Guinness World Records states it is Kalaupapa, Hawaii, at 1,010 m high. Another contender is the north face of Mitre Peak, which drops 1,683 m to Milford Sound, New Zealand. These are subject to a less stringent definition, as the average slope of these cliffs at Kaulapapa is about 1.7, corresponding to an angle of 60 degrees, and Mitre Peak is similar. A more vertical drop into the sea can be found at Maujit Qaqarssuasia (also known as the 'Thumbnail') which is situated in the Torssukátak fjord area at the very tip of South Greenland and drops 1,560 m near-vertically.

Considering a truly vertical drop, Mount Thor on Baffin Island in Arctic Canada is often considered the highest at 1370 m (4500 ft) high in total (the top 480 m (1600 ft) is overhanging), and is said to give it the longest vertical drop on Earth at 1,250 m (4,100 ft). However, other cliffs on Baffin Island, such as Polar Sun Spire in the Sam Ford Fjord, or others in remote areas of Greenland may be higher.

List

The following is an incomplete list of cliffs of the world.

Africa
Above Sea
Faneque, Gran Canaria, Spain, 1027 m above Atlantic Ocean
Above Land
 Innumerable peaks in the Drakensberg mountains of South Africa are considered cliff formations. The Drakensberg Range is regarded, together with Ethiopia's Simien Mountains, as one of the two finest erosional mountain ranges on Earth. Because of their near-unique geological formation, the range has an extraordinarily high percentage of cliff faces making up its length, particularly along the highest portion of the range. Of all, the "Drakensberg Amphitheatre" (mentioned above) is most well known. Other notable cliffs include the Trojan Wall, Cleft Peak, Injisuthi Triplets, Cathedral Peak, Monk's Cowl, Mnweni Buttress, etc.
The Tugela Falls, the world's second tallest waterfall, falls  over the edge of the cliff face.
 Mount Meru, Tanzania Caldera Cliffs, 

America

North 

Several big granite faces in the Arctic region vie for the title of 'highest vertical drop on Earth', but reliable measurements are not always available. The possible contenders include (measurements are approximate):

Mount Thor, Baffin Island, Canada; 1,370 m (4,500 ft) total; top 480 m (1600 ft) is overhanging. This is commonly regarded as being the largest vertical drop on Earthot:leapyear at 1,250 m (4,100 ft).

 The sheer north face of Polar Sun Spire, in the §74:MTAtoFa
of Baffin Island, rises 4,300 ft above the flat frozen fjord, although the lower portion of the face breaks from the vertical wall with a series of ledges and buttresses.
Ketil's and its neighbor Ulamertorsuaq's west faces in Tasermiut, Greenland have been reported as over 1,000 m high. Another relevant cliff in Greenland is Agdlerussakasit's Thumbnail.

Other notable cliffs include:
 Ättestupan Cliff, northern side of Kaiser Franz Joseph Fjord, Greenland 
 Big Sandy Mountain, east face buttress, Wind River Range, Wyoming, 550 m
 Calvert Cliffs along the Chesapeake Bay in Maryland, U.S. 25 m
 Cap Éternité of Saguenay River, Quebec, Canada, 347 m
 All faces of Devils Tower, Wyoming, United States, 195 m
 Doublet Peak, southwest face, Wind River Range, Wyoming, United States, 370 m
 El Capitan, Yosemite Valley, California, United States; 900 m (3,000 ft)
 Grand Teton, north face Teton Range, Wyoming 
 Northwest Face of Half Dome, near El Capitan, California, United States; 1,444 m (4,737 ft) total, vertical portion about 610 m (2,000 ft)
 Longs Peak Diamond, Rocky Mountain National Park, Colorado, United States, 400 m
 Mount Asgard, Baffin Island, Canada; vertical drop of about 1,200 m (4,000 ft).
 Mount Siyeh, Glacier National Park (U.S.) north face, 
 The North Face of North Twin Peak, Rocky Mountains, Alberta, Canada, 1,200 m
 Painted Wall in Black Canyon of the Gunnison National Park, Colorado, United States; 685 m (2,250 ft)
 Raftsmen's Acropolis, a rock face of the Montagne des Érables, Quebec, Canada, 800 m
 Rockwall, Kootenay National Park, British Columbia, Canada, 30 km of mostly unbroken cliffs up to 900 m 
 Royal Gorge cliffs, Colorado, United States, 350 m
 Faces of Shiprock, New Mexico, United States, 400 m
 All walls of the Stawamus Chief, Squamish, British Columbia, Canada, up to 500 m
 Temple Peak, east face, Wind River Range, Wyoming, 400 m
 Temple Peak East, north face, Wind River Range, Wyoming, 450 m
 Toroweap (a.k.a. Tuweep), Grand Canyon, Arizona, United States; 900 m (3,000 ft)
 Uncompahgre Peak, northeast face, San Juan Range, Colorado, 275 m (550 m rise above surrounding plateau)
 East face of the West Temple in Zion National Park, Utah, United States believed to be the tallest sandstone cliff in the world, 670 m

South 

 All faces of Auyan Tepui, along with all other Tepuis, Venezuela, Brazil, and Guyana, Auyan Tepui is about 1,000 m (location of Angel Falls) (the falls are 979 m, the highest in the world)
 All faces of Cerro Chalten (Fitz Roy), Patagonia, Argentina-Chile, 1200 m
 All faces of Cerro Torre, Patagonia, Chile-Argentina
 Pão de Açúcar/Sugar Loaf, Rio de Janeiro, Brazil, 395 m
 Pared de Gocta, Peru, 771 m
 Pared Sur Cerro Aconcagua. Las Heras, Mendoza, Argentina, 2,700 m
 Pedra Azul, Pedra Azul State Park, Espirito Santo, Brazil, 540 m
 Scratched Stone (Pedra Riscada), São José do Divino/MG, Minas Gerais, Brazil, 1,480 m
 Faces of the Torres del Paine group, Patagonia, Chile, up to 900 m

Asia
Above Sea
 Qingshui Cliff, Xiulin Township, Hualien County, Taiwan averaging 800 m above Pacific Ocean. The tallest peak, Qingshui Mountain, rises 2408 m directly from the Pacific Ocean.
 Theoprosopon, between Chekka and Selaata in north Lebanon jutting into the Mediterranean.
 Tōjinbō, Sakai, Fukui prefecture, Japan 25 m above Sea of Japan
Above Land
 Various cliffs in the Ak-Su Valley of Kyrgyzstan are high and steep.
 Baintha Brakk (The Ogre), Panmah Muztagh, Gilgit–Baltistan, Pakistan, 2,000 m
 Gyala Peri, southeast face, Mêdog County, Tibet, China, 4,600 m
 Hunza Peak south face, Karakoram, Gilgit–Baltistan, Pakistan, 1,700 m
 K2 west face, Karakoram, Gilgit–Baltistan, Pakistan, 2900m
 The Latok Group, Panmah Muztagh, Gilgit–Baltistan, Pakistan, 1,800 m
 Lhotse northeast face, Mahalangur Himal, Nepal, 2900m
 Lhotse south face, Mahalangur Himal, Nepal, 3200 m
 Meru Peak, Uttarakhand, India, 1200 m
 Nanga Parbat, Rupal Face, Azad Kashmir, Pakistan, 4,600 m
 Qingshui Cliff, Xiulin Township, Hualien County, Taiwan averaging 800 m above Pacific Ocean. The tallest peak, Qingshui Mountain, rises 2408 meters directly from the Pacific Ocean.
 Ramon Crater, Israel, 400 m
 Shispare Sar southwest face, Karakoram, Gilgit–Baltistan, Pakistan, 3,200 m
 Spantik northwest face, Karakoram, Gilgit–Baltistan, Pakistan, 2,000 m
 Trango Towers: East Face Great Trango Tower, Baltoro Muztagh, Gilgit–Baltistan, Pakistan, 1,340 m (near vertical headwall), 2,100 m (very steep overall drop from East Summit to Dunge Glacier). Northwest Face drops approximately 2,200 m to the Trango Glacier below, but with a taller slab topped out with a shorter overhanging headwall of approximately 1,000 m. The Southwest "Azeem" Ridge forms the group's tallest steep rise of roughly 2,286 m (7,500 ft) from the Trango Glacier to the Southwest summit.
 Uli Biaho Towers, Baltoro Glacier, Gilgit–Baltistan, Pakistan
 Ultar Sar southwest face, Karakoram, Gilgit–Baltistan, Pakistan, 3,000 m
 World's End, Horton Plains, Nuwara Eliya, Sri Lanka. It has a sheer drop of about 4000 ft (1200 m)
 Various cliffs in Zhangjiajie National Forest Park, Hunan Province, China. The cliffs can get to around 1,000 ft (300 m).

Europe
Above Sea
Beachy Head, England, 162 m above the English Channel
Beinisvørð, Faroe Islands, 470 m above North Atlantic
Belogradchik Rocks, Bulgaria - up to 200 m high sandstone towers
Benwee Head Cliffs, Erris, Co. Mayo, Ireland, 304 m above Atlantic Ocean
Cabo Girão, Madeira, Portugal, 589 m above Atlantic Ocean
Cap Canaille, France, 394 m above Mediterranean sea is the highest sea cliff in France
Cape Enniberg, Faroe Islands, 750 m above North Atlantic
Conachair, St Kilda, Scotland 427 m above Atlantic Ocean, highest sea cliff in the UK
Croaghaun, Achill Island, Ireland, 688 m above Atlantic Ocean
Dingli Cliffs, Malta, 250 m above Mediterranean sea
Dvuglav, Rila Mountain, Bulgaria 460 m (south face)
Étretat, France, 84 m above the English Channel
Faneque, Gran Canaria, Spain, 1027 m above Atlantic Ocean
Hangman cliffs, Devon 318 m above Bristol Channel is the highest sea cliff in England
High Cliff, between Boscastle and St Gennys, 223 m above Celtic Sea
Hornelen, Norway, 860 m above Skatestraumen
Hvanndalabjarg, Ólafsfjörður, Iceland, 630 m above Atlantic Ocean
Jaizkibel, Spain, 547 m above the Bay of Biscay
Kaliakra cliffs, Bulgaria, more than 70 m above the Black Sea
The Kame, Foula, Shetland, 376 m above the North Atlantic, second highest sea cliff in the UK
Le Tréport, France, 110 m above the English Channel
Cliffs of Moher, Ireland, 217 m above Atlantic Ocean
Møns Klint, Denmark, 143 m above Baltic Sea
Monte Solaro, Capri, Italy, 589 m above the Mediterranean Sea
Ontika Limestone cliff, Estonia, 55 m above Baltic Sea.
Preikestolen, Norway, 604 m above Lysefjorden
Slieve League, Ireland, 601 m above Atlantic Ocean
Snake Island, Ukraine, 41 m above the Black Sea
Vixía Herbeira, Northern Galicia, Spain, 621 m above Atlantic Ocean
White cliffs of Dover, England, 100 m above the Strait of Dover

Above Land
The six great north faces of the Alps (Eiger 1,500 m, Matterhorn 1,350 m, Grandes Jorasses 1,100 m, Petit Dru 1,000 m, and Piz Badile 850 m, Cima Grande di Lavaredo 450 m)
Giewont (north face), Tatra Mountains, Poland, 852 m above Polana Strążyska glade
Kjerag, Norway 984 m.
Mięguszowiecki Szczyt north face rises to 1,043 m above Morskie Oko lake level, High Tatras, Poland
Troll Wall, Norway 1,100 m above base
Vihren peak north face, Pirin Mountain, Bulgaria 460 m to the (Golemiya Kazan)
Vratsata, Vrachanski Balkan Nature Park, Bulgaria 400 m 
Submarine 
Bouldnor Cliff - the waters of the coast of the Isle of Wight

Oceania 
Above Sea
 Ball's Pyramid, a sea stack 562m high and only 200m across at its base
 The Elephant, New Zealand, has cliffs falling approx 1180m into Milford Sound, and a 900m drop in less than 300m horizontally
 Great Australian Bight
 Kalaupapa, Hawaii, 1,010 m above Pacific Ocean
 The Lion, New Zealand, 1,302 m above Milford Sound (drops from approx 1280m to sea level in a very short distance)
 Lovers Leap, Highcliff, and The Chasm, on Otago Peninsula, New Zealand, all 200 to 300 m above the Pacific Ocean
 Mitre Peak, New Zealand, 1,683 m above Milford Sound
 Tasman National Park, Tasmania, has 300m dolerite sea cliffs dropping directly to the ocean in columnar form
 The Twelve Apostles (Victoria). A series of sea stacks in Australia, ranging from approximately 50 to 70 m above the Bass Strait
 Zuytdorp Cliffs in Western Australia
Above Land
 Mount Banks in the Blue Mountains National Park, New South Wales, Australia: west of its saddle there is a 490 m fall within 100 M horizontally.
 Omarama Clay Cliffs, Waitaki District, New Zealand

As habitat 
Cliff landforms provide unique habitat niches to a variety of plants and animals, whose preferences and needs are suited by the vertical geometry of this landform type. For example, a number of birds have decided affinities for choosing cliff locations for nesting, often driven by the defensibility of these locations as well as absence of certain predators.

Flora
The population of the rare Borderea chouardii, during 2012, existed only on two cliff habitats within western Europe.

See also 
 Cliffed coast
 List of landforms
 Steilhang

References

External links
 

 
Coastal geography
Erosion landforms
Slope landforms
Coastal and oceanic landforms
Oronyms